Brabazon Ponsonby, 1st Earl of Bessborough (1679 – 4 July 1758), was a British politician and peer. He was the son of William Ponsonby, 1st Viscount Duncannon, and Mary Moore. He was an active politician from 1705 to 1757 in Great Britain and Ireland. He represented Newtownards and Kildare County in the Irish House of Commons. He inherited his father's viscountcy in 1724 and was made Earl of Bessborough in the Peerage of Ireland in 1739. He is buried in Fiddown, County Kilkenny, Ireland.

Ponsonby married Sarah Margetson, an heiress whose family owned Bishopscourt, County Kildare, and his family remained there until the 1830s.

Family
Ponsonby married twice. His first marriage was in 1704 to Sarah Margetson (d. 21 May 1733), daughter of John Margetson and Alice Caulfeild, and granddaughter of James Margetson, Archbishop of Armagh. Sarah had previously been married to Hugh Colville, son of Sir Robert Colville of Newtownards and his third wife Rose Leslie. Sarah's children by Brabazon Ponsonby:

 Lady Sarah Ponsonby (d. 19 January 1736 or 1737); married in 1727 Edward Moore, 5th Earl of Drogheda, and had issue.
 William Ponsonby, 2nd Earl of Bessborough (1704 – 11 March 1793); married on 5 July 1739, Lady Caroline Cavendish, eldest daughter of William Cavendish, 3rd Duke of Devonshire; had issue.
 John Ponsonby (29 March 1713 – 16 August 1787); married on 22 September 1743 Lady Elizabeth Cavendish, also a daughter of the 3rd Duke of Devonshire; had issue.
 Lady Letitia Ponsonby ( – 9 February 1754); married on 3 November 1742 Hervey Morres; had issue.

Following his wife's death in May 1733, Ponsonby married Elizabeth Sankey (circa 1680 – 17 July 1738), daughter of John Sankey and Eleanor Morgan, on 28 November 1733.

Ranks and offices held
 Member of Parliament for Newtownards, County Down, between 1705 and 1714
 Captain, 27th Regiment; Enniskillen – 1707
 Sheriff and Governor of County Kilkenny – 1713
 Sheriff and Governor of County Kildare – 1714
 Member of Parliament: Kildare – 1715 to 1724
 Privy Counsellor (invested) – 10 May 1727
 Commissioner of the Revenue – 1739 to 1744
 Marshal of the Admiralty in Ireland – 1751 to 1752
 Lord Justice in Ireland – 1754 to 1755
 Vice-Admiral of Munster – 1755
 Lord Justice in Ireland – 1756 to 1757

Titles 
 17 November 1724: Succeeded his father as 2nd Viscount Duncannon, of the Fort of Duncannon, county of Wexford, and as 2nd Baron Bessborough, of Bessborough, county of Kilkenny
 6 October 1739: Created 1st Earl of Bessborough, Ireland
 12 June 1749: Created 1st Baron Ponsonby of Sysonby, county of Leicester, Great Britain

References

Year of birth uncertain
1768 deaths
1679 births
27th Regiment of Foot officers
Members of the Privy Council of Ireland
Brabazon
High Sheriffs of Kildare
Members of the Parliament of Ireland (pre-1801) for County Down constituencies
Members of the Parliament of Ireland (pre-1801) for County Kildare constituencies
Ponsonby, Brabazon
Ponsonby, Brabazon
Brabazon
Peers of Great Britain created by George II